Benjamin Say (August 28, 1755 – April 23, 1813) was a member of the U.S. House of Representatives from Pennsylvania.

Biography
Benjamin Say was born in Philadelphia, Pennsylvania, to Thomas (1709–1796) and Rebekah Atkinson Budd Say (1716–1795), He married Ann Bartram Bonsall (1759–1793) on Oct. 1, 1776, a granddaughter of naturalist John Bartram. Their son Thomas Say (1787–1835) became a pioneering entomologist.

Say graduated from the medical department of the University of Pennsylvania in Philadelphia in 1780 and practiced in that city. He also worked as an apothecary. He served in the American Revolutionary War, and was a fellow of the College of Physicians of Philadelphia, of which he was one of the founders in 1787, and was treasurer from 1791 to 1809. He was a member of the Pennsylvania Prison Society and president of the Pennsylvania Humane Society. He was a member of the Pennsylvania State Senate.

Say was elected as a Democratic-Republican to the Tenth Congress to fill the vacancy caused by the resignation of Joseph Clay. He was reelected to the Eleventh Congress and served until his resignation in June 1809.

He had a grand house to the southwest of the then-borders of Philadelphia. Dubbed "The Cliffs", it overlooked the Schuylkill River near Gray's Ferry, just upriver from the Bartram estate.

Death
He died in Philadelphia in 1813.

Notes

Sources

The Political Graveyard
Plan of Say Burial Ground, at 3rd and Arch Streets in Philadelphia
Watercolor of grave marker

Perelman School of Medicine at the University of Pennsylvania alumni
Politicians from Philadelphia
Pennsylvania state senators
1755 births
1813 deaths
People of colonial Pennsylvania
Democratic-Republican Party members of the United States House of Representatives from Pennsylvania